Metopaulias is a monotypic genus of fully terrestrial land crabs which do not need to go back to the sea to spawn. The female lays about 90 eggs, then tends to her offspring, removing dead leaves that would deoxygenate the water and adding snail shells to the pool to provide high levels of calcium that they require, catching cockroaches and millipedes to feed them, and killing larvae of the damselfly Diceratobasis macrogaster which would otherwise eat them.

References

Fauna of Jamaica
Grapsoidea
Terrestrial crustaceans
Monotypic crustacean genera
Taxa named by Mary J. Rathbun